The Guest is a 2018 South Korean television series about exorcism and shamanism that stars Kim Dong-wook, Kim Jae-wook, and Jung Eun-chae. It aired from September 12 to November 1, 2018 as OCN's first series on the newly created Wednesdays and Thursdays at 23:00 (KST) time slot.

Despite not airing in prime time, the series received a peak rating of 4% nationwide.

Synopsis

Yoon Hwa-Pyung, the young son of a shaman family, is psychic and can see ghosts. After a villager is possessed and makes eye contact with Hwa-Pyung, he too is possessed by a powerful spirit called Park Il-Do. His mother is then mysteriously killed and his grandmother commits suicide. His father blames him for the deaths. Priest Yang is invited to perform an exorcism on the boy, along with the young priest-in-training, Priest Choi. Hwa-Pyung whispers that he has something to tell Priest Choi, who leans in and is subsequently possessed, with the spirit leaving Hwa-Pyung's body. 

Priest Choi returns home and brutally murders his parents before finding his younger brother, Choi Yoon, hiding under his bed. At the same time, Hwa-Pyung runs away from home after his father tries to strangle him. Having Priest Choi's address, he decides to go to his house but stops at the entrance, sensing an evil spirit inside. A policewoman and her daughter, Kang Kil-Young, drive by and see Hwa-Pyung; the policewoman investigates the house and finds Choi Yoon; she tells him to run before being murdered by Priest Choi. Yoon flees the house, joining Kil-young and Hwa-Pyung outside. As Kil-young moves to go into the house to find her mother, Hwa-Pyung stops her, saying she shouldn’t go in. As the police arrive, he sees the possessed Priest Choi, standing eerily in the field, staring at him.

In 2018, 20 years after the incident, Hwa-Pyung is now a taxi driver who uses his psychic abilities to help those who are possessed, with his ultimate goal being to find Priest Choi in order to exorcise Park Il-do from his body. Hwa-pyung has a wall devoted to news articles about families being brutally killed and has been tracking deaths all over the country that are suspiciously similar to those committed by Priest Choi. With his powers, he is able to see through the eyes of the possessed and find out who they have killed, which results in his entanglement with Kang Kil-Young, who followed her mother's footsteps and became a police detective. Choi Yoon is now a priest, also determined to find his possessed brother, while reluctantly exorcising those who are possessed with the help of Hwa-Pyung. Unbeknownst to the three of them, they were the three children from the incident 20 years ago, though they do not recognize each other now all these years later.

Park Il-do orders the weaker spirits to possess people who are emotionally weak. Hwa-Pyung and Choi Yoon work together to expel demons while Kang Kil Young works to bring justice to the victims while being skeptical of spirits.

Cast

Main
 Kim Dong-wook as Yoon Hwa-pyung, a shaman who was born with psychic powers.
 Choi Seung-hoon as young Yoon Hwa-pyung
 Kim Jae-wook as Choi Yoon / Matthew, a cynical and cold priest who alienates people but is recognized by his abilities as an exorcist.
 Jung Yoo-geun as young Choi Yoon
 Jung Eun-chae as Kang Gil-young, a passionate and tough but easygoing detective who does not believe in the supernatural.
 Kim Ji-young as young Kang Gil-young

Supporting
 Lee Won-jong as Yook Gwang
 Park Ho-san as Detective Ko Bong-sang, Gil-young's partner.
 Ahn Nae-sang as Priest Yang
  as Priest Choi Sang-hyun
 Jeon Bae-soo as Kim Young-soo
 Baek Bum-soo as Choi Min-goo
 Lee Joong-ok as Choi Min-sang
 Park Ji-a as Believer Kim	
 Kim Hye-eun as Park Hong-joo
  as Kim Ryoon-hee 
 Shim Yi-young as Lee Hye-kyung
  as Jung Hyun-soo
 Heo Yool as Jung Seo-yoon
  as Park Eui-won
 Kim Tae-hoon as Kang Jong-ryeol
  as Han Mi-jin
 Han Kyu-won
 Kwon Ye-eun as Oh Cho-hee's daughter
 Kim Ji-won as Son Hyun-joo
 Yoo Seung-mok as Yoon Hwa-pyung's father

Special appearance
 Park Hyo-joo as Gil-young's mother

Original soundtrack

Part 1
Part 2

Viewership

Notes

References

External links
  
 
 

OCN television dramas
Korean-language television shows
2018 South Korean television series debuts
2018 South Korean television series endings
South Korean mystery television series
South Korean thriller television series
South Korean horror fiction television series
Television series by Studio Dragon